Cosi, COSI or CoSi may refer to:

 Così, a 1992 play by Louis Nowra
 Cosi (film), 1996, based on the play
 Così (restaurant), an American fast-casual restaurant chain
 Compton Spectrometer and Imager, or COSI, a NASA telescope to be launched in 2025 
 COSI (Center of Science and Industry), a science museum and research center in Columbus, Ohio, U.S.
 COSI Toledo, now Imagination Station, a science museum in Toledo, Ohio, U.S.
Cobalt monosilicide, a material with the chemical formula CoSi
 Julián Cosi (born 1998), an Argentine footballer
 Valerio Cosi (born 1985), an Italian musician

See also
 
 Così fan tutte (disambiguation)
 Così è (se vi pare) (disambiguation)